František Fišer (18 July 1900 – 14 March 1942) was a Czech weightlifter. He competed in the men's heavyweight event at the 1924 Summer Olympics. He was killed in the Dachau concentration camp during World War II.

References

External links
 

1900 births
1942 deaths
Czech male weightlifters
Olympic weightlifters of Czechoslovakia
Weightlifters at the 1924 Summer Olympics
Czech people who died in Dachau concentration camp
Czechoslovak civilians killed in World War II
Sportspeople from Prague